The festivals or Jamaican festivals are a kind of deep-fried bread, typical of Jamaican cuisine. Despite its slightly sweet taste, is served as a side dish to dishes such as fried fish, escovitch fish or jerk chicken.

It is a dough made with wheat flour, Cornmeal, baking powder, salt, milk powder unflavored milk or evaporated milk, sugar and water, then fried in a neutral cooking oil and served hot. The finished festival should be crispy on the outside while soft and fluffy on the inside.

See also

 Bulla cake
 Bammy
 Coco bread
 Hard dough bread
 Jamaican cuisine
 List of Jamaican dishes

References

Quick breads
Jamaican breads
Fried dough
Milk dishes